David Charles Croston (born November 10, 1963) is a former tackle in the National Football League.

Biography 
Croston was born David Charles Croston on November 10, 1963 in Sioux City, Iowa.

Career 
Croston was the drafted in the third round (61) of the 1987 NFL Draft by the Green Bay Packers. He had a one-year career playing 16 games for the Packers in 1988. Croston played at the collegiate level at the University of Iowa.

See also 
List of Green Bay Packers players

References 

1963 births
Living people
American football offensive tackles
Green Bay Packers players
Iowa Hawkeyes football players
Players of American football from Iowa
Sportspeople from Sioux City, Iowa